"Poireiton Khunthok" or "Poireiton Khunthokpa"  (literally, immigration by Poireiton) is an ancient Meitei literary narrative work (puya), describing about the immigration of a band of colonies, led by a man, Poireiton, the prince and younger brother of Thongaren, the god of the underworld kingdom, in the plains of the Kangleipak kingdom (present day Manipur).

It is partially an allegorical work, which includes mythical elements as the integral parts of the saga. Part of the lore is that the knowledge of how to use fire was introduced to the people of Kangleipak by Poireiton.

Related pages 

 Leithak Leikharol

Further reading 

 Poireiton Khunthok - full text

References 

Meitei culture
Pages with unreviewed translations
Puyas